The North American Eagle Project was a jet powered car that was intended to challenge the  (Mach 1.02) land speed record set by the ThrustSSC in 1997. The venture was a collaboration between Canadian and US engineers, pilots, and mechanics. In 2013, they had hoped to reach , or Mach 1.058.

In a land speed record attempt on August 27, 2019, the North American Eagle crashed, killing driver Jessi Combs. Since the crash, the project has been abandoned.

Description
The vehicle was based on the fuselage of a Lockheed F-104A-10 Starfighter jet fighter aircraft, tail number 56-0763, The aircraft was built for the United States Air Force and assigned to the Air Force Flight Test Center at Edwards Air Force Base from August 29, 1957 until 1970 when it was retired. Initially the aircraft was used as a GE test platform for the J79 engine. It was later used as a chase plane for the North American X-15, Lockheed SR-71 Blackbird and North American XB-70 Valkyrie test programs. It was flown by Joe Walker, Scott Crossfield, Pete Knight, Bill Dana, Chuck Yeager, Joe Engle and Bob Gilliland among other notable pilots. North American Eagle has designed road suspension and has carried out the necessary systems integration for it.

Powerplant
The engine was a General Electric LM1500 turbojet (a civilian variation of the aircraft's original J79).
A stock engine for low speed testing is rated at 42,500 hp (31.7 MW). The vehicle had an enhanced engine for record attempts, rated at 52,000 hp (52,700 metric horsepower).

Braking systems
, four methods were in use to decelerate the vehicle. The vehicle also had an anti-skid neodymium rare-earth magnet eddy-current brake.
The vehicle failing to stop has been suggested as a factor in the crash of the North American Eagle in an August 2019 land-speed record run.

Runs
Fourteen engine test runs were conducted on a test stand, the first in June 2004, with the last two using full afterburner. In December 2004, the first test runs of the vehicle were performed. A total of 23 test runs were completed with the vehicle between March 2006 and June 2008. Testing in the US was conducted at Sanderson Field in Shelton, Washington; Toledo Airport in southwest Washington state; Edwards AFB, California; El Mirage Dry Lake, California; and Black Rock Desert, Nevada. 

On October 9, 2013, Jessi Combs drove the North American Eagle (NaE) Supersonic Speed Challenger at the Alvord desert, claiming the women's 4-wheel land speed record with an official run of 398.954 mph (632 km/h) and a top speed of 440.709 mph (709 km/h). In doing so, she broke the 48-year-old women's land speed record, a  run average set by Lee Breedlove in Spirit of America - Sonic 1 in 1965. On September 7, 2016, Combs set a new top speed of  driving the Other American Eagle.

Fatal crash
On August 27, 2019, the North American Eagle crashed during a land speed record attempt, killing driver Jessi Combs. Reports indicate that the car failed to stop and traveled beyond the edge of the lake bed. 

Investigation into the cause of the crash was reported in November 2019. The investigation revealed that the front wheel assembly of the car collapsed, likely due to collision damage from hitting something on the track.

See also
 List of vehicle speed records
 Bloodhound SSC

References

External links
North American Eagle Project
"North American Eagle Project eyes speed record", Earth & Sky (2006-12-01)
part 1
part 2
North American Eagle Black Rock Desert Photography 

Jet land speed record cars
Lockheed F-104 Starfighter